Selma is a 2014 historical drama film directed by Ava DuVernay, and produced by Dede Gardner, Jeremy Kleiner, Christian Colson, and Oprah Winfrey. The screenplay was written by Paul Webb. The film follows the events leading up to and during the Selma to Montgomery marches, and the resulting establishment of the Voting Rights Act of 1965 which prohibited racial discrimination in voting in the United States. The film stars David Oyelowo as civil rights activist Martin Luther King Jr., Tom Wilkinson as President Lyndon B. Johnson, and Tim Roth as Governor of Alabama George Wallace. Carmen Ejogo, Dylan Baker, Wendell Pierce, Common, and Winfrey feature in supporting roles.

Selma premiered at the AFI Fest on November 11, 2014 in Los Angeles. Paramount Pictures initially provided the film a limited release on December 25 before a wide release at over 2,100 theaters on January 9, 2015. Selma grossed a worldwide total of over $66 million on a production budget of $20 million. Rotten Tomatoes, a review aggregator, surveyed 301 reviews and judged 99 percent to be positive. The film garnered awards and nominations in a variety of categories with particular praise for its direction, Oyelowo's portrayal of King, and the song "Glory" by John Legend, and Common. At the 87th Academy Awards, Selma won for Best Original Song for "Glory" and also received a nomination for Best Picture—the first film directed by a black female director to achieve this feat. The film received four nominations at the 72nd Golden Globe Awards, winning the Best Original Song award for "Glory". DuVernay's nomination for Best Director was the first for a black female director.

The film received the most awards at the 46th NAACP Image Awards, winning for Outstanding Actor in a Motion Picture for Oyelowo, Outstanding Supporting Actor in a Motion Picture for Common, and Outstanding Supporting Actress in a Motion Picture for Ejogo. At the 2015 Black Reel Awards, Selma joint-led the nominations with Dear White People, both films receiving ten nominations. It went on to win eight including Outstanding Film, Outstanding Actor – Feature for Oyelowo, and Outstanding Director – Feature for DuVernay. The American Film Institute included Selma in their list of top ten films of the year.

Accolades

See also
 2014 in film

References

External links
 

Selma